In mathematics, the Poisson summation formula is an equation that relates the Fourier series coefficients of the periodic summation of a function to values of the function's continuous Fourier transform.  Consequently, the periodic summation of a function is completely defined by discrete samples of the original function's Fourier transform.  And conversely, the periodic summation of a function's Fourier transform is completely defined by discrete samples of the original function.  The Poisson summation formula was discovered by Siméon Denis Poisson and is sometimes called Poisson resummation.

Forms of the equation

The basic Poisson summation formula is:

Then  is a special case (P=1, x=0) of this generalization:

which is a Fourier series expansion with coefficients that are samples of function  Similarly:

also known as the important Discrete-time Fourier transform.

The Poisson summation formula can also be proved quite conceptually using the compatibility of Pontryagin duality with short exact sequences such as

Applicability

 holds provided  is a continuous integrable function which satisfies

 holds in a pointwise sense under the strictly weaker assumption that  has bounded variation and
     

Applications

Method of images
In partial differential equations, the Poisson summation formula provides a rigorous justification for the fundamental solution of the heat equation with absorbing rectangular boundary by the method of images. The Poisson summation formula similarly provides a connection between Fourier analysis on Euclidean spaces and on the tori of the corresponding dimensions. In one dimension, the resulting solution is called a theta function.

In electrodynamics, the method is also used to accelerate the computation of periodic Green's functions.

Sampling
In the statistical study of time-series, if  is a function of time, then looking only at its values at equally spaced points of time is called "sampling."  In applications, typically the function  is band-limited, meaning that there is some cutoff frequency  such that  is zero for frequencies exceeding the cutoff:  for   For band-limited functions, choosing the sampling rate  guarantees that no information is lost: since  can be reconstructed from these sampled values.  Then, by Fourier inversion, so can  This leads to the Nyquist–Shannon sampling theorem.

Ewald summation
Computationally, the Poisson summation formula is useful since a slowly converging summation in real space is guaranteed to be converted into a quickly converging equivalent summation in Fourier space.  (A broad function in real space becomes a narrow function in Fourier space and vice versa.)  This is the essential idea behind Ewald summation.

Approximations of integrals
The Poisson summation formula is also useful to bound the errors obtained when an integral is approximated by a (Riemann) sum.

Lattice points in a sphere
The Poisson summation formula may be used to derive Landau's asymptotic formula for the number of lattice points in a large Euclidean sphere.  It can also be used to show that if an integrable function,  and  both have compact support then

Number theory
In number theory, Poisson summation can also be used to derive a variety of functional equations including the functional equation for the Riemann zeta function.

One important such use of Poisson summation concerns theta functions: periodic summations of Gaussians .  Put , for  a complex number in the upper half plane, and define the theta function:

By choosing  and using the fact that  one can conclude:

     by putting 

It follows from this that  has a simple transformation property under  and this can be used to prove Jacobi's formula for the number of different ways to express an integer as the sum of eight perfect squares.

Sphere packings
Cohn & Elkies proved an upper bound on the density of sphere packings using the Poisson summation formula, which subsequently led to a proof of optimal sphere packings in dimension 8 and 24.

Other
 It can be used to prove the functional equation for the theta function.
 Poisson's summation formula appears in Ramanujan's notebooks and can be used to prove some of his formulas, in particular it can be used to prove one of the formulas in Ramanujan's first letter to Hardy.
 It can be used to calculate the quadratic Gauss sum.

Generalizations
The Poisson summation formula holds in Euclidean space of arbitrary dimension. Let  be the lattice in  consisting of points with integer coordinates.

Moreover, for all  in    (Fourier transform on ) equals  (Fourier transform on ).

More precisely, if

for some C, δ > 0, then

where both series converge absolutely and uniformly on Λ.

The dual lattice Λ′ can be defined as a subset of the dual vector space or alternatively by Pontryagin duality. Then the statement is that the sum of delta-functions at each point of Λ, and at each point of Λ′, are again Fourier transforms as distributions, subject to correct normalization.

This is applied in the theory of theta functions, and is a possible method in geometry of numbers. In fact in more recent work on counting lattice points in regions it is routinely used − summing the indicator function of a region D over lattice points is exactly the question, so that the LHS of the summation formula is what is sought and the RHS something that can be attacked by mathematical analysis.

Selberg trace formula

Further generalization to locally compact abelian groups is required in number theory. In non-commutative harmonic analysis, the idea is taken even further in the Selberg trace formula, but takes on a much deeper character.

A series of mathematicians applying harmonic analysis to number theory, most notably Martin Eichler, Atle Selberg, Robert Langlands, and James Arthur,  have generalised the Poisson summation formula to the Fourier transform on non-commutative locally compact reductive algebraic groups   with a discrete subgroup   such that   has finite volume. In this setting,   plays the role of the real number line in the classical version of Poisson summation, and   plays the role of the integers   that appear in the sum. The generalised version of Poisson summation is called the Selberg Trace Formula,  and has played a role in proving many cases of Artin's conjecture and in Wiles's proof of  Fermat's Last Theorem.

The Poisson summation formula is the archetype for vast developments in harmonic analysis and number theory.

Convolution theorem

The Poisson summation formula is a particular case of the convolution theorem on tempered distributions. If one of the two factors is the Dirac comb, one obtains periodic summation on one side and sampling on the other side of the equation. Applied to the Dirac delta function and its Fourier transform, the function that is constantly 1, this yields the Dirac comb identity.

See also
 
 Post's inversion formula
 Voronoi formula
 Discrete-time Fourier transform
 Explicit formulae for L-functions

References

Further reading

Fourier analysis
Generalized functions
Lattice points
Theorems in analysis
Summability methods